James Ashmore may refer to:

 James Ashmore (footballer) (born 1986), English football player
 James N. Ashmore (1878–1944), American football, basketball, and baseball coach
 James Ashmore Creelman (1894–1941), American screenwriter
 Jim Ashmore (born 1935), American basketball player